Gatehouse Bank PLC (بوابة البيت) is a UK-regulated bank headquartered in London, with offices in Milton Keynes and Wilmslow.

Gatehouse Bank is a Shariah-compliant challenger bank which is a subsidiary of the Gatehouse Financial Group Limited. It is authorised by the Prudential Regulation Authority (PRA) and regulated by the PRA and the Financial Conduct Authority (FCA). Founded in 2007, the Bank operates in accordance with Shariah principles. It also sources and advises on UK real estate investments with a focus on the build-to-rent and private rented sector.

Banks of the United Kingdom
Banks based in the City of London